The December 2015 North American storm complex, also known as Winter Storm Goliath, was a major storm complex that produced a tornado outbreak, a winter storm, a blizzard and an ice storm in areas ranging from the Southwestern United States to New England. Tornadoes impacted areas around Dallas, Texas while several other states, especially Missouri, were affected by heavy rain and snow causing severe floods. As the system moved through the Great Lakes region, heavy rain, ice pellets and heavy snow fell in the entire region. Wintry mix moved through southern Ontario and Quebec had significant snowfall on December 29. Almost 60 people were killed in the storm system and its aftermath, which made it one of the deadliest of such systems of 2015 in the United States.

Meteorological history 

The outbreak was caused by a vigorous upper-level trough that moved into the Central and Southern Plains states on December 25. An extratropical cyclone developed ahead of this upper-level trough over the West Coast, which moved southeast into the Southwestern United States early on December 26. As the initial low-pressure area moved over the United States–Mexico border, a southwards dip in the jet stream to the west had formed. In response to this, an upper-level low developed by evening on December 26. This upper-level low began to track to the north, drawing moisture from the Pacific Ocean and Gulf of Mexico. As it did so, a long cluster of heavy showers and thunderstorms fired up from eastern Oklahoma to southwestern Missouri, which set up a severe flooding event.

At the same time, discrete tornadic supercells began to appear in areas of Texas. One of the cells produced a violent EF4 wedge tornado, which ripped through parts of Garland and Rowlett, Texas, causing major damage and killing 10 people. As the storm complex began to move to the north, more supercells began to appear with several more tornadoes being reported. By the early morning of December 27, the supercells merged into a squall line, with tornado reports beginning to diminish, but occasionally a few isolated tornadoes would be produced by the storm.

While producing severe weather in the Deep South, the storm complex produced heavy snow and blizzard conditions in the southwestern parts of Texas through December 26–27, as frigid temperatures had spilled south into the area just the previous day before. Strong winds contributed to power outages and blowing and drifting snow. The snowfall continued throughout the majority of December 27, before tapering off near midnight as the storm system began to pull out of the region.

By December 28, the storm complex had moved into the Central United States, producing more snow, ice, heavy rain, and severe weather in an area stretching from the Midwest into Louisiana. The upper-level low eventually began to take over as the dominant low, and had begun to make a more east-northeastwards turn. Rain eventually reached areas like Philadelphia and New York City late on December 28, and persisted somewhat into the early morning hours of December 29. At this point, the storm system had already entered Canada, and its circulation was beginning to become elongated. The remnants of the storm eventually dissipated, early on December 30.

Confirmed tornadoes

December 26 event

December 27 event

December 28 event

Preparations and impact

Tornado outbreak

Texas
On December 26, 2015, the tornado outbreak portion of the storm system, with 32 tornadoes total confirmed, began when 12 tornadoes impacted Texas that evening, mostly in and around the Dallas–Fort Worth metroplex, killing 13 people, which made it the deadliest tornado disaster in the area since the Dallas tornado of 1957, and added to the highest tornado death count in the U.S. for the month of December since 1953. An EF3 tornado moved through multiple subdivisions in Ovilla and Glenn Heights, Texas on the south side of the metroplex, destroying numerous homes and two churches. Ten people in Garland, Texas died as a result of a large and powerful EF4 wedge tornado that also destroyed many homes in the neighboring suburb of Rowlett. An EF2 tornado killed two people in Copeville, while an EF1 caused another fatality near Blue Ridge. Additional tornadoes touched down across the Southern United States on December 27 and 28. Most of these tornadoes were weak, though EF2 tornadoes caused considerable damage near Marianna, Arkansas and Marshall, Texas. More than 65,000 people lost power in the area due to the tornadoes. The Dallas Mavericks had to delay their NBA game against the Chicago Bulls by one hour due to the threat of severe weather.

Damage from tornadoes in Texas alone is estimated at $1.2 billion. There were also 635 injuries.

Flooding

Southern United States
The storm system was responsible for heavy rain that caused severe flooding in 13 states, with Missouri being especially impacted. At least 14 people died due to the floods in Missouri alone. More than 180 roads, including portions of Interstates 44, 55, and 70, and several bridges were closed. At least 380 homes and 70 businesses were flooded in Franklin County.

Approximately 140,000 sandbags were brought in to protect portions of the Bayshore subdivision in Arnold. At least 150 homes succumbed to flooding in the city. More than 100 boat rescues were conducted in Eureka.

Major flooding also occurred in south Alabama, where the Pea River in Elba, Alabama flooded. Most of the rainfall occurred on Christmas Eve day when training thunderstorms went over the same areas. All in all, a widespread  occurred.

Nine levees were topped—five along the Mississippi River, three along the Missouri River, and one along the Kaskaskia River—though the affected areas were predominantly unpopulated. Large stretches of the Mississippi River were placed on alert due to projected major flooding.

Flash flooding also claimed seven lives in Illinois, two in Oklahoma, one in Arkansas, and one in Georgia.

Winter storm

High Plains
The combination of heavy snow, strong winds, and bitterly cold temperatures resulted in blizzard conditions across most of New Mexico, southeastern Colorado, western Oklahoma and West Texas. In the path of this Texas low, a swath of snow and ice impacted the central Plains and Midwest from Oklahoma to Wisconsin as the storm system moved northeastward toward the eastern Great Lakes. The storm system spread a wintry mix of snow, sleet and freezing rain to New York State and New England, disrupting travel in the region. At least 1 person in New Mexico, and 4 people in Oklahoma died as a direct result of the winter storm system. Interstate 10 in western Texas was shut down due to the storm, while Midland, Texas experienced their 3rd snowiest day on record.

Elsewhere and Canada
More than 750 flights were cancelled at Chicago O'Hare International Airport, and hundreds more at Detroit, Toronto and Montreal. Due to a strong Arctic air mass north of the system, parts of northern Michigan, Ontario and all Quebec suffered blizzard conditions, with moderate snow bands and moderate winds as well. 20–30 cm of snow (8–12 in) fell in Ottawa–Gatineau, less than 10 cm (4 in) in Toronto, and the greater Montreal region had 30–40 cm of snow (12–16 in).

Four people died in Minnesota in a car accident linked to snow-covered roads. Two people died from overexertion while clearing snow in Milwaukee, Wisconsin. Other similar indirect deaths from the winter storm were reported in New Mexico (1 death), Missouri (2), Michigan (1), New York (1), Vermont (3), New Hampshire (1), and Maine (1).

The dairy industry in eastern New Mexico and western Texas lost 30,000 cows to the storm.

See also
 Late December 2012 North American storm complex
 December 2013 North American storm complex
 November 2015 United States ice storm
 Mid-January 2017 North American ice storm
 Tornado outbreak and floods of April 28 – May 1, 2017

Notes

References

External links 
 North and Central Texas December 26, 2015 Tornado Outbreak (NWS Fort Worth)

F4 tornadoes by date
Storm complex,12
Storm complex,12
Storm complex,12
United States,12
Storm complex,12
2015,12
Storm complex,2015,12
Storm complex,2015,12
Storm complex,12
Storm complex,12
Mississippi River floods
Storm complex,12
Storm complex,12
Storm complex,12
Storm complex,12
Storm complex,12
Storm complex,2015,12
Storm complex,2015,12
Storm complex